Carthamus glaucus, the glaucous star thistle, is a species of plant in the family Asteraceae. It is found in Israel, Lebanon and Egypt. It is also reported as an invasive species in Victoria, Australia.

It is parasitized by Cuscuta babylonica.

See also 
 Flora of Lebanon

References

External links 
 
 Carthamus glaucus at Flora of Israel online
 Carthamus glaucus at vro.agriculture.vic.gov.au

glaucus
Flora of Israel
Flora of Lebanon
Flora of Palestine (region)
Plants described in 1798